Demange is a French surname. It may refer to:

People 
 Joseph Demange (c. 1707—83), French godfather madame du Barry
 Edgar Demange (1841—1925), French jurist
 Emmanuel Clément-Demange (born 1970), French footballer
 Jean-Marie Demange (1943—2008), French politician
 Ken DeMange (born 1964), Irish footballer
 Paul Demange (politician) (1906—1970), Monégasque politician
 Paul Demange (actor) (1901—1983), French actor
 Yann Demange (born 1977), French film director

Other 
 Demange-aux-Eaux, commune of France.

References